(To the Most Holy Virgin: Two Letters in One Voice) is a collection of two hymns to the Virgin Mary: "" (1904, Whether your high purity) and "" (1908, Prayer to Mary), composed by Eudalt Serra; the text of the second hymn was written by Jacint Verdaguer in 1908.

References 

1908 compositions
Marian hymns